This list of members of the National Academy of Sciences includes approximately 2,000 members and 350 foreign associates of the United States National Academy of Sciences, each of whom is affiliated with one of 31 disciplinary sections. Each person's name, primary institution, and election year are given.

 Animal, nutritional, and applied microbial sciences
 See List of members of the National Academy of Sciences (Animal, nutritional and applied microbial sciences)

 Anthropology
 See List of members of the National Academy of Sciences (Anthropology)

 Applied mathematical sciences
 See List of members of the National Academy of Sciences (Applied mathematical sciences)

 Applied physical sciences
 See List of members of the National Academy of Sciences (Applied physical sciences)

 Astronomy
 See List of members of the National Academy of Sciences (Astronomy)

 Biochemistry
 See List of members of the National Academy of Sciences (Biochemistry)

 Biophysics and computational biology
 See List of members of the National Academy of Sciences (Biophysics and computational biology)

 Cellular and developmental biology
 See List of members of the National Academy of Sciences (Cellular and developmental biology)

 Cellular and molecular neuroscience
 See List of members of the National Academy of Sciences (Cellular and molecular neuroscience)

 Chemistry
 See List of members of the National Academy of Sciences (Chemistry)

 Computer and information sciences
 See List of members of the National Academy of Sciences (Computer and information sciences)

 Economic sciences
 See List of members of the National Academy of Sciences (Economic sciences)

 Engineering sciences
 See List of members of the National Academy of Sciences (Engineering sciences)

 Environmental sciences and ecology
 See List of members of the National Academy of Sciences (Environmental sciences and ecology)

 Evolutionary biology
 See List of members of the National Academy of Sciences (Evolutionary biology)

 Genetics
 See List of members of the National Academy of Sciences (Genetics)

 Geology
 See List of members of the National Academy of Sciences (Geology)

 Geophysics
 See List of members of the National Academy of Sciences (Geophysics)

 Human environmental sciences
 See List of members of the National Academy of Sciences (Human environmental sciences)

 Immunology
 See List of members of the National Academy of Sciences (Immunology)

 Mathematics
 See List of members of the National Academy of Sciences (Mathematics)

 Medical genetics, hematology, and oncology
 See List of members of the National Academy of Sciences (Medical genetics, hematology, and oncology)

 Medical physiology and metabolism
 See List of members of the National Academy of Sciences (Medical physiology and metabolism)

 Microbial biology
 See List of members of the National Academy of Sciences (Microbial biology)

 Physics
 See List of members of the National Academy of Sciences (Physics)

 Physiology and pharmacology
 See List of members of the National Academy of Sciences (Physiology and pharmacology)

 Plant biology
 See List of members of the National Academy of Sciences (Plant biology)

 Plant, soil, and microbial sciences
 See List of members of the National Academy of Sciences (Plant, soil, and microbial sciences)

 Psychology
 See List of members of the National Academy of Sciences (Psychology)

 Social and political sciences
 See List of members of the National Academy of Sciences (Social and political sciences)

 Systems neuroscience
 See List of members of the National Academy of Sciences (Systems neuroscience)

External links
Search box for member names

Lists
National Academy of Sciences